The Kraburi River (BGN/PCGN: myitkyina, Kyan River), also Kra or Pak Chan River is the boundary river between Thailand and Myanmar at the Kra Isthmus of the Malay Peninsula. The river has its source in the Tenasserim Hills and flows into the Andaman Sea near the Thai town of Ranong and Kawthaung (Victoria Point), Myanmar.

It is a protected area. Lam Nam Kraburi National Park covers most of the Thai side of the estuary, while the Ranong Biosphere Reserve and the Laemson Ramsar Site include areas to the south.

The sovereignty of three Andaman Sea islands at the river's mouth remain disputed. The standing agreement, negotiated in February 1982, left undetermined the status of Ginga Island (Ko Lam), Ko Kham, and Ko Ki Nok at the mouth of the Kraburi River (Pak Chan River). Subsequent negotiations in 1985, 1989, and 1990 made no progress. The two parties have designated the islands as "no man's land". Ongoing tensions in the area resulted in minor clashes in 1998, 2003, and 2013.

References

External links
Laemson Ramsar site
Lam Nam Kraburi National Park
Ranong province website on the Ranong Biosphere Reserve

Rivers of Thailand
Andaman Sea
Myanmar–Thailand border
Rivers of Myanmar